Firebuds is an American computer-animated television series created by Craig Gerber, produced by Electric Emu Productions and Disney Television Animation. The series premiered on Disney Junior on September 21, 2022. In January 2023, the series was renewed for a second season.

Plot 
A group of kids and their rescue vehicle buddies go through the communities of Gearbox Grove and Motopolis and help keep them safe from danger.

Characters

Main 
 Bo Bayani (voiced by Declan Whaley) — A Filipino-American boy who is an aspiring firefighter. He is the leader of the Firebuds.
 Flash Fireson (voiced by Terrence Little Gardenhigh) — Bo's firetruck vroom-mate. He gets very hyperactive, especially when rescuing people and vehicles.
 Violet Vega-Vaughn (voiced by Vivian Vencer) — An Asian-American girl who is an aspiring paramedic. She loves gymnastics and going fast.
 Axl Ambrose (voiced by Lily Sanfelippo) — Violet's ambulance vroom-mate. She loves carkour and going fast like Violet.
 Jayden Jones (voiced by Jecobi Swain) — An African-American boy who is an aspiring cop. He is an inventor who loves to eat.
 Piston Porter (voiced by Caleb Paddock) — Jayden's police car vroom-mate. He loves rules and being safe.

Recurring 
 Chief Bill Bayani (voiced by Lou Diamond Phillips) — Bo's father and co-chief of the Gearbox Grove Fire Department.
 Chief Faye Fireson (voiced by Yvette Nicole Brown) — Flash's mother and co-chief of the Gearbox Grove Fire Department.
 Beth Bayani (voiced by Melissa Rauch) — Bo's mother who is a therapist.
 Floyd Fireson (voiced by Kevin Michael Richardson) — Flash's father who is a carchitect.
 Val Vega-Vaughn (voiced by Natalie Morales) — Violet's paramedic mother.
 Arnie Ambrose (voiced by Stephen Guarino) — Axl's ambulance father.
 Viv Vega-Vaughn (voiced by Allison Case) — Violet's mechanic mother.
 AJ Ambrose (voiced by Ian James Corlett) — Axl's semi-hauler father.
 Jenna Jones (voiced by LaChanze) — Jayden's mother and Deputy Chief of the Bureau of Community Support for the Motopolis Police Department.
 Pete Porter (voiced by Sean Kenin) — Piston's father and Jenna's M.P.D. partner.
 Jamal Jones (voiced by Brandon Victor Dixon) — Jayden's father who is a traffic cop for the Motopolis Police Department.
 Pam Porter (voiced by Hope Levy) — Piston's mother and Jamal's M.P.D. partner.
 Jazzy Jones (voiced by Lauren 'Lolo' Spencer) — Jayden's paraplegic sister.
 Piper Porter (voiced by Sammi Haney) — Piston's sister and Jazzy's electric wheelchair vroom-mate.
 June (voiced by Tessa Espinola) — News reporter and a friend of the Firebuds.
 Vance (voiced by Max Mitchell) — June's vroom-mate and news camera operator.
 Harry (voiced by Cameron Crovetti) — A friend of the Firebuds and Violet's biggest fan.
 Carly (voiced by Abigail Zoe Lewis) — Harry's vroom-mate and Axl's biggest fan.
 Iggy (voiced by Benjamin Valic) — The Firebuds' rude and obnoxious neighbor.
 Rod (voiced by Henry Kaufman) — Iggy's rude and obnoxious vroom-mate.
 Chef Al (voiced by José Andrés) — Chef and co-owner of the Overdrive Cafe.
 Chef Fernando (voiced by Oscar Nunez) — Chef Al's food truck vroom-mate and co-owner of the Overdrive Cafe.
 Bang, Pow, and Zip (voiced by Gavin McCrillis, Grayson Boulom, and Nylan Parthipan respectively) — Three small rambunctious cars and brothers.
 Duck Family — A family consisting of a mother duck and three ducklings. They are seen walking around, sometimes causing traffic.

Villains 
 The Riley Gang — A gang of young thieves and the Firebuds' arch-enemies.
 Wayne Riley (voiced by Atticus Shaffer) — The leader of the Riley Gang. He invents tools for his crimes and has heterochromia.
 Grant (voiced by Cleo Berry) — Wayne's vroom-mate in crime.
 Wiley Riley (voiced by Luna Bella Zamora) — Wayne's sister and partner in crime.
 Gauge (voiced by Kensington Tallman) — Wiley's vroom-mate in crime. She gets annoyed when people don't acknowledge her for a crime she and Wiley commit.

Episodes

Reception

Critical response 
Alex Reif of Laughing Place asserted, "Firebuds teaches kids that the colorful vehicles with lights and sounds that enchant them on the roads have an important job to do. They can do their part by following the rules and playing safe. And when someone needs help, offer a hand if you’re able. While the show isn’t the first to tackle this same theme, it sets itself apart by including kids as both relatable humans and fun vehicles, and it is more reflective of the world we live in today to inspire the next generation of forward thinkers." Ashley Moulton of Common Sense Media gave the series a grade of 3 out of 5 stars, complimented the educational value, saying the series teaches responsibility, and praised the positive messages and role models, stating the characters demonstrate teamwork and friendliness.

Accolades 
Firebuds received a nomination for Outstanding Children's Programming at the 34th GLAAD Media Awards.

Notes

References

External links 
 
 

2020s American animated television series
2020s American children's television series
2020s preschool education television series
2022 American television series debuts
American children's animated adventure television series
American children's animated comedy television series
American children's animated fantasy television series
American computer-animated television series
American preschool education television series
Animated preschool education television series
Animated television series about children
Disney Junior original programming
English-language television shows
Television series by Disney Television Animation